Erbium(III) hydroxide is an inorganic compound with chemical formula Er(OH)3.

Chemical properties
Erbium(III) hydroxide reacts with acids and produces erbium(III) salts:
 Er(OH)3 + 3 H+ → Er3+ + 3 H2O
Erbium(III) hydroxide decomposes to ErO(OH) at elevated temperature. Further decomposition produces Er2O3.

References

Erbium compounds
Hydroxides